Marshall High School is a secondary school in the city of Marshall in the U.S. state of Illinois. It is the sole high school in Marshall Community Unit School District #C-2.

References

External links
 
 IRC

Public high schools in Illinois
Schools in Clark County, Illinois